Monster's Ball is a 2001 American romantic drama film directed by Marc Forster, produced by Lee Daniels and written by Milo Addica and Will Rokos, who also appear in the film. It stars Billy Bob Thornton, Heath Ledger, Halle Berry, and Peter Boyle, with Sean Combs, Mos Def, and Coronji Calhoun in supporting roles.

Thornton portrays a corrections officer who begins a relationship with a woman (Berry), unaware that she is the widow of a man (Combs) he assisted in executing. Principal photography began in May 2001 in New Orleans, Louisiana and lasted for five weeks.

Monster's Ball premiered at AFI Fest on November 11, 2001, and was theatrically released in the United States on February 8, 2002 by Lionsgate Films. The film received positive reviews, with critical acclaim directed at Berry, Ledger and Thornton's performances, Forster's direction, and Addica and Rokos' screenplay. It was also a significant commercial success, grossing $44.9 million worldwide on a production budget of $4 million.

The film received numerous accolades and nominations, and was nominated twice at the 74th Academy Awards for Best Actress (Berry) and Original Screenplay (Addica and Rokos), with Berry winning for her performance, becoming the first, and to date only, African-American woman to win the award.

Plot

Hank Grotowski, a widower, and his son, Sonny, are corrections officers in a Georgia prison. They reside with Hank's father, Buck, an ailing, bigoted retired corrections officer whose wife committed suicide. When Willie and Darryl Cooper, friends of Sonny's who are black come by the house, Hank frightens them off with a shotgun at the behest of Buck.

Hank, the prison's deputy warden, is to oversee the execution of convicted murderer Lawrence Musgrove. Musgrove is visited by his wife Leticia and son Tyrell before his execution. While at home, overwhelmed by her husband's impending death as well as numerous personal and financial difficulties, Leticia lashes out at her son for his obesity, resorting to physical and emotional abuse. The night before the execution, Hank tells Sonny that a "monster's ball" is held by the corrections officers, a get-together of those who will participate in the execution. While Musgrove waits to be taken, he draws a sketch of Sonny and Hank. The proceedings prove too much for Sonny, who, as he is leading Lawrence to the electric chair, vomits, and then collapses. Following the execution, Hank confronts Sonny in the prison's bathroom and assaults him for ruining Musgrove's last walk.

The next morning, Hank attacks Sonny in his bed and orders him to leave the house. Sonny grabs a revolver from under his pillow and holds his father at gunpoint. The confrontation ends in their living room with Sonny asking his father if he hates him. After Hank confirms that he does, and always has, Sonny commits suicide by shooting himself in the chest. A devastated Hank buries Sonny in the back garden. He subsequently resigns as deputy warden, burns his uniform in the backyard, and locks the door of Sonny's room. He later purchases a local gas station in an attempt to provide a distraction in his retirement. The Coopers offer condolences to Hank, which he accepts.

One rainy night, Hank is driving and sees Tyrell lying on the ground by the side of the road, with Leticia calling for help. After some hesitation, Hank stops. On being told Tyrell was struck by a car, he drives them to a hospital, where Tyrell dies from his injuries. At the suggestion of the authorities at the hospital, Hank drives Leticia home. A few days later, Hank gives Leticia a ride home from the diner where she works. They begin talking in the car about their common losses, and she invites him in. Hank finds out that Leticia is Lawrence's widow, though he does not tell her that he participated in her husband's execution. They drown their grief with alcohol and have sex.

Hank eventually offers to give Leticia Sonny's truck, it having been fixed up by the Coopers and their father Ryrus. She finally accepts after initial discomfort. Leticia stops by Hank's home with a present for him where she meets Buck, who insults her and implies that Hank is only involved with her because he enjoys sex with black women. Leticia, offended by the remarks, refuses to interact with Hank. After Hank is made aware of Buck's actions, he finally commits his father to a nursing home. He then renames the gas station "Leticia's", saying it is his girlfriend's name when asked.

Leticia is evicted from her home and Hank invites her to move in with him. While he is out, she discovers Lawerence's drawings of Sonny and Hank, discovering Hank's involvement in her husband's death. She is disturbed at first by the revelation, but numbed by her suffering, she stays. The film ends with the two of them eating ice cream together on the back porch, as Hank states that he thinks they’ll be okay.

Cast
 Billy Bob Thornton as Hank Grotowski
 Halle Berry as Leticia Musgrove
 Heath Ledger as Sonny Grotowski
 Peter Boyle as Buck Grotowski
 Coronji Calhoun as Tyrell Musgrove
 Sean Combs as Lawrence Musgrove
 Mos Def as Ryrus Cooper
 Charles Cowan Jr. as Willie Cooper
 Taylor LaGrange as Darryl Cooper

Development

The basis for this film came from the desire of actor-turned-writers Addica and Rokos to make a script that would interest a big star alongside themselves with Harvey Keitel in mind since he liked the latter's writing when offered one of their scripts. They were inspired by their troubled relationships with their fathers as a starting point that eventually led to a generational tale about executioners, which eventually led to the inspiration for the title (an old term for the last meal of a condemned man and a "ball" that took place with his jailers the night before). They wrote the script over a period of eight months over the course of 1995 that eventually inspired a bit of interest through a producer of a film Rokos had acted in. Years of development occurred due to interest from filmmakers ranging from Robert DeNiro to Oliver Stone along with studios that wanted a lighter ending, but the transition to Lee Daniels and Lionsgate led to interest back to the original ending. The film was produced by Lionsgate and Lee Daniels Entertainment, the first production for the latter. Before Halle Berry was cast as Leticta, Angela Bassett and Vanessa Williams were first cast, but both of them declined. Wes Bentley turned down the part of Sonny, which eventually went to Heath Ledger.

Production 
Principal photography began in May 2001 in New Orleans, Louisiana and lasted for five weeks. A week before production, Combs auditioned for the role of Lawrence Musgrove, and won it. At one point, the production moved to the fields, cellblocks and death houses of Louisiana State Penitentiary for a week to shoot prison interiors and exteriors, with some scenes shot in actual death chambers.

Reception
The film received mostly positive reviews, with Berry's performance being widely acclaimed. Review aggregator website Rotten Tomatoes reported that 121 of 143 reviews were positive, giving the film a score of 85% with an average rating of 7.34/10, and was certified "Fresh". The site's critical consensus states, "Somber and thought provoking, Monster's Ball has great performances all around." On Metacritic, the film received a 69 out of 100, indicating "generally favorable reviews".

Roger Ebert gave the film four stars and rated it as the best film of 2001, stating that it "has the complexity of great fiction". Ebert also praised the performances of Berry and Thornton, saying, "[Thornton] and [Berry] star as Hank and Leticia, in two performances that are so powerful because they observe the specific natures of these two characters, and avoid the pitfalls of racial cliches. What a shock to find these two characters freed from the conventions of political correctness, and allowed to be who they are: weak, flawed, needful, with good hearts tested by lifetimes of compromise." Of the screenplay, Ebert wrote, "The screenplay by [Addica] and [Rokos] is subtle and observant; one is reminded of short fiction by Andre Dubus, William Trevor, Eudora Welty, Raymond Carver. It specifically does not tell "their" story, but focuses on two separate lives. The characters are given equal weight, and have individual story arcs, which do not intersect but simply, inevitably, meet."

Ben Falk of BBC.com spoke highly of Berry and Thornton's performances, writing, "This is by far Berry's best-ever performance and Thornton reminds us that there are few, if any, leading men who can convey sadness and hope almost simultaneously in just one minimal glance."

In a negative review, Jeffrey Chen of ReelTalk Movie Reviews complimented the performances, but was critical of the script, writing, "Unfortunately, too many things bothered me so that I could not buy in to the movie. I didn't buy the idea that both Hank and Leticia needed each other -- Leticia needs Hank, but I got the feeling that Hank would've fared just fine (albeit less happily) without Leticia. If I wasn't supposed to see Hank as needing Leticia, then the movie would simply become a demeaning man-saves-woman story. I was also skeptical of the notion that sex heals wounds as well as it clearly does for these two characters." He finished off his review by saying, "Monster's Ball really isn't as offensive as I'm making it sound, but it had enough problems to trouble me to the point where I can't wholeheartedly recommend it. It may be worth seeing for the acting alone. It's a two-person show, with [Thornton] turning in another strong performance and [Berry] breaking out and showing her range. If you're a fan of either or both of these two, you'll be quite happy with the movie. Outside of that, I make no guarantees -- unless you just really enjoy your share of rescue fantasies."

Accolades

References

External links
 
 
 
 
 

2001 romantic drama films
2001 films
American independent films
American romantic drama films
2000s English-language films
Films about capital punishment
Films about race and ethnicity
Films about racism
Films directed by Marc Forster
Films featuring a Best Actress Academy Award-winning performance
2001 independent films
Films set in Georgia (U.S. state)
Films shot in Louisiana
Films about interracial romance
Lionsgate films
Films about grieving
Films about father–son relationships
2000s American films